TVB may refer to:

 In broadcasting
 Television Broadcasts Limited
 TV Belgrade, former name of Radio Television of Serbia
 Television Bureau of Advertising
 Others
 Traffic Violations Bureau of New York State.
 The Von Bondies, American rock band
 Temagami volcanic belt, a geologic feature in Temagami, Ontario, Canada
 Thermal Velocity Boost, an Intel microprocessor turbo boost technology